Kayla Jay McKenna (born 3 September 1996) is a professional footballer who plays as a forward for Scottish SWPL club Rangers and the Jamaica women's national team.

Club career

Houston Dash

Rangers
In May 2021, McCoy started training with Rangers, leading to her signing with the club three months later.

International career
McCoy made her debut for Jamaica in a 1–0 friendly win against Chile on 28 February 2019. She was named to the 23-player Jamaica squad for the 2019 FIFA Women's World Cup in France. However, because of a knee injury prior the tournament, she had to be replaced by Mireya Grey.

International goals
Scores and results list Jamaica's goal tally first

Honours
Rangers
 Scottish Women's Premier League: 2021–22
 Scottish Women's Premier League Cup: 2022
 City of Glasgow Woman's Cup: 2022

Personal life
McCoy's grandparents were born in Jamaica. Her grandfather is Pearnel Charles. In June 2022, Kayla McCoy married Ciaran McKenna in Oak Park, Illinois, USA.

References

External links

1996 births
Living people
Citizens of Jamaica through descent
Jamaican women's footballers
Women's association football forwards
Jamaica women's international footballers
Jamaican people of American descent
People from Skokie, Illinois
Sportspeople from Cook County, Illinois
Soccer players from Illinois
American women's soccer players
Duke Blue Devils women's soccer players
Houston Dash draft picks
Houston Dash players
Rangers W.F.C. players
National Women's Soccer League players
African-American women's soccer players
American sportspeople of Jamaican descent
21st-century African-American sportspeople
21st-century African-American women
American expatriate sportspeople in Scotland
Jamaican expatriate sportspeople in Scotland
American expatriate women's soccer players
Jamaican expatriate women's footballers
Expatriate women's footballers in Scotland
Scottish Women's Premier League players